Fare zones 7–9 are ancillary zones of the Travelcard and Oyster card fares scheme managed by Transport for London, used for calculating fares from some stations outside Greater London that are not in zones 4, 5 and 6. Travelcards are available on Oyster with validity in these zones. They are not included in the validity of National Rail out-boundary Travelcards unless mentioned in the Route section as "AAA LDN ZONE 7-9". Fare zones 10–15 (or A–F by their hexadecimal number) have fares set by National Rail train operating companies and the zones themselves are not publicised.

Scope
The zones extend in segments from the boundary of Greater London to the north and west into Hertfordshire and Buckinghamshire, to the east into Essex and Kent and to the south into Surrey and West Sussex. Unlike zones 1–6, they do not form complete rings around London but rather patches. They include eight London Underground stations on the Metropolitan line and London Overground stations.

Zone 7

Zone 7 consists of the Hertfordshire stations on the Metropolitan Line and the first London Overground and West Anglia Main Line stations outside zone 6.

Zone 8

Zone 9

The following stations are within zone 9:

Special Zones
These zones have their fares set by National Rail companies. Zones are referred to by their decimal or hexadecimal number. Zones are allocated corridors extending out from London, rather than the roughly concentric circles that the non-special zones have.

Zone 11, or Zone B, consists of the stations out to Hertford not covered by numbered zones, as well as Potters Bar and Radlett

Zone 12, or Zone C, is  station

Zone 13, or Zone D, consists of the stations between zone 6 and Gatwick Airport

Zone 14, or Zone E, is  station

The following stations are inside the Oyster zonal system, but special fares apply:

Contactless-only
The London pay-as-you-go system continues beyond the zones. Due to technical limitations with Oyster cards, they are not valid and only contactless payment cards may be used.

The following stations are contactless only:

Changes
January 1997: Debden and Theydon Bois moved from Zone A to Zone 6, Epping moved from Zone B to zone 6 and Moor Park moved from zone A to zones 6 and A
January 1998: Amersham and Chesham moved from zone C to zone D
January 2004: Watford moved from zone B to zone A
January 2008: Zones A (Croxley, Rickmansworth and Watford) and B (Chorleywood) merged and renamed zone 7. Zone C (Chalfont & Latimer) renamed zone 8. Zone D (Amersham and Chesham) renamed zone 9.
January 2010: Chafford Hundred, Grays, Purfleet and Ockendon added to system in new zone 'G'. Watford Junction added to system in new zone 'W'. 
January 2013: Theobalds Grove and Waltham Cross added to system in zone 7. Cheshunt added to system in zone 8. Brentwood and Broxbourne added to system in new zone 11. Shenfield added to system in new zone 12
 May 2015: Brentwood moved from zone 11 to Zone 9
 September 2015: Dartford added to system in zone 8
 October 2015: Rye House, St Margarets (Hertfordshire), Ware and Hertford East added to system in zone 11
 January 2016: Merstham, Redhill, Earlswood, Salfords and Horley added to the system in new zone 13. Gatwick Airport added to system in new zone 14
 March 2016: Swanley added to system in zone 8
 February 2019: Epsom added to system in zone 9 (although the zone isn't publicised)
 April 2019: Cuffley (zone 9 but not publicised), Bayford (zone 11) and Hertford North (zone 11) added to system
 August 2019: Potters Bar and Radlett added to system in zone 11 - the last stations to get Oyster
 August 2019: Brookmans Park added to system (contactless only)
 October 2019: St Albans, Harpenden and Luton Airport Parkway added to system (contactless only)
 November 2019: Welham Green, Hatfield and Welwyn Garden City added to system (contactless only)
 January 2020: Burnham, Iver, Langley, Maidenhead, Reading, Slough, Taplow and Twyford added to the system (contactless only)
 March 2022: Henley-on-Thames, Shiplake, Wargrave and Windsor & Eton Central added to the system (contactless only)
May 2022: Furze Platt, Cookham, Bourne End and Marlow added to the system (contactless only)

See also

Notes
Note a:  The following stations outside Greater London are in zones 4–6:

 (4)
 (5)
 (5)
 (6)
 (6)
 (6)
 (6)
 (6)
 (6)
 (6)
 (6)
 (6)
 (6)
 (6)
 (6)
 (6 & 7)
 (6)
 (6)
 (6)
 (6)
 (6)
 (6)
 (6)

References

Transport in Buckinghamshire
Transport in Essex
Transport in Hertfordshire
Transport in Kent
Transport in Surrey
Transport in Thurrock
Transport in West Sussex
Rail transport stations in London by fare zone
London transport-related lists